Tillandsia compacta is a species of flowering plant in the genus Tillandsia. This species is native to Cuba, Hispaniola, Colombia, Bolivia, Venezuela and Ecuador.

References

compacta
Flora of South America
Flora of the Caribbean
Plants described in 1865